Dyno is an emergency drainage and plumbing company operating in the United Kingdom. Formed in 1963 as Dyno-Rod, Dyno initially specialised in the use of electromechanical machines for drain clearance. Since then, the company has grown considerably, consolidating its drainage business and diversifying into comprehensive plumbing services, for both domestic and industrial sites. It is a franchise granting limited company.

Dyno describes itself as "the market leader"." Apart from clearing blockages, it uses CCTV to inspect drains, makes plumbing repairs, and installs new pipework. The company offers a twenty four hour emergency response service across the United Kingdom and Eire.

Dyno-Rod was acquired by Centrica's subsidiary British Gas for £57.6 million ($104.3m) in October 2004.

History 
Dyno-Rod service was launched in 1963 by Jim Zockoll, in South London, and the business was based in Surbiton for many years. Zockoll was a flight engineer for Pan American, who spotted an opportunity whilst on a stopover in London: the hotel where he was staying was suffering drainage problems, had outdated repair equipment, and was taking too long on repairs. 

Zockoll realised that he had a business opportunity using newer American equipment. It is said that he had the equipment flown over, enabling him to fix the problem, and giving birth to the company Dyno-Rod.

Dyno-Rod based its drain cleaning service on what were then new electromechanical techniques. After initial success, Dyno began granting franchise licences in 1965. There are currently twenty five Dyno franchisees in the United Kingdom. As the first non fast food franchised business in the United Kingdom, and the second franchised business of any kind there, Dyno-Rod played a prominent role in the formation of the British Franchise Association, of which it remains a full member.

Over time, the Dyno brand developed other associated businesses. Dyno-Secure was launched in 1987, to offer a range of locks and security services, while in 2001, Dyno-Plumbing offered a comprehensive plumbing service. Dyno Group was acquired by British Gas, a subsidiary of Centrica, in October 2004. Since then, Dyno franchisees have developed larger territories and operate multiple brands within the Dyno group.

The group is based in the British Gas Swan House office complex in Staines.

In popular culture 
The then Prime Minister, David Cameron, compared himself in April 2014 to the company's services, saying "If there are things that are stopping you from doing more, think of me as a giant Dyno-Rod".

References

External links 
 

Centrica
Plumbing
Retail companies established in 1963
2004 mergers and acquisitions
Cleaning companies
1963 establishments in England